Rakshit Dagar (born 16 October 1992) is an Indian professional footballer who plays as a goalkeeper for Jamshedpur in the Indian Super League.

Career

United Sikkim
Dagar made his debut for United Sikkim F.C. on 23 March 2013 during an I-League match against Prayag United S.C. at the Paljor Stadium in Gangtok, Sikkim in which he was in Starting 11; United Sikkim lost the match 0–1.

DSK Shivajians
Rakshit Dagar not play any I-League matches from DSK Shivajians but he played several matches in the Durand Cup, Federation Cup, and DSK CUP.

Minerva Punjab
In September 2017, Dagar make his move to the only I-League club from north India. As a part of Minerva Punjab FC Dagar is also in the Minerva Squad of Punjab League Where he played 2-3 matches till date (29-10-2017) and conceded not a single goal.

East Bengal
On 23 April 2018, Dagar joined East Bengal.

Gokulam Kerala
Dagar joined Gokulam Kerala on 9 July 2021. He played a crucial role as the club clinched I-League title in 2021–22 season, defeating Mohammedan Sporting 2–1 in the final game at the Salt Lake Stadium on 14 May, and became the first club in fifteen years to defend the title.

At the 2022 AFC Cup group-stage opener, Dagar and his side achieved a historic 4–2 win against Indian Super League side ATK Mohun Bagan.

Career statistics

Club

Honours
Gokulam Kerala
I-League: 2021–22

References

External links

Indian footballers
1986 births
Living people
Footballers from Delhi
Association football goalkeepers
I-League players
United Sikkim F.C. players
DSK Shivajians FC players
RoundGlass Punjab FC players
East Bengal Club players
Sudeva Delhi FC players
Calcutta Football League players
Gokulam Kerala FC players